Wake Up Call is an American reality television series hosted by Dwayne "The Rock" Johnson that premiered on December 12, 2014, and aired through January 30, 2015, on TNT.

Premise
Opening introduction (narrated by Dwayne "The Rock" Johnson):

Episodes

References

External links
 
 
 

2010s American reality television series
2014 American television series debuts
English-language television shows
TNT (American TV network) original programming